Chris McKenzie (born March 17, 1982, in New York, New York) is a former professional Canadian football cornerback who most recently played for the Saskatchewan Roughriders of the Canadian Football League. He was signed as an undrafted free agent by the Houston Texans in 2005. He played college football for the Arizona State Sun Devils.  Before joining the Sun Devils, McKenzie played at Glendale Community College.

Football career

Amateur
After obtaining his high school equivalency, McKenzie began looking for a junior college where he could play football, eventually settling on Glendale Community College in Arizona.  McKenzie played two seasons for the Gauchos, and finished his junior college career as the 46th best prospect in the country at his level.  During his time at Glendale, McKenzie was named the team's Defensive MVP in his sophomore season, was named a first-team All-American by the National Junior College Athletic Association (NJCAA) and was listed as one of the top junior college prospects by SuperPrep Magazine and JC Gridwire.

McKenzie chose to attend Arizona State University after exhausting his junior college eligibility.  He played two seasons for the Sun Devils, seeing action in all 24 games and starting 20.  At both Glendale and Arizona State, McKenzie was considered one of the fastest players on the team.

On March 18, 2015, McKenzie signed a one-day contract with the Saskatchewan Roughriders and retired as a Rider, where he spent most of his professional career.

References

External links
Just Sports Stats

1982 births
Living people
Players of American football from New York City
American players of Canadian football
American football cornerbacks
Arizona State Sun Devils football players
Houston Texans players
Arizona Rattlers players
Saskatchewan Roughriders players
Glendale Gauchos football players